This is a list of some of the standards of concert band repertoire.

Original works
This is an inclusive list of the accepted standard works written specifically for concert band or wind ensemble.

Cornerstone works
The following works are some of the most universally respected and established cornerstones of the band repertoire. All have "stood the test of time" through decades of regular performance, and many, either through an innovative use of the medium or by the fame of their composer, helped establish the wind band as a legitimate, serious performing ensemble.

Kenneth J. Alford (Fred J. Ricketts)
Colonel Bogey (1914)
Samuel Barber
Commando March (1943)
Robert Russell Bennett
Suite of Old American Dances (1949)
Symphonic Songs for Band (1957)
Hector Berlioz
Grande symphonie funèbre et triomphale, Op. 15 (1840)
Arthur Bird
Suite in D Major, Op. 29 (1889)
John Barnes Chance
Elegy (1972)
Incantation and Dance (1960)
Symphony No. 2 (1972)
Variations on a Korean Folk Song (1966)
Aaron Copland
Emblems (1964)
Variations on a Shaker Melody (1944/1958)
Ingolf Dahl
Saxophone Concerto (1948) 
Sinfonietta (1961)
Antonín Dvořák
Serenade in D Minor (1878)
Henry Fillmore
Americans We (1929)
The Footlifter (1935)
His Honor (1933)
Morton Gould
American Salute (1943)
Symphony No. 4 (West Point) (1952)
Claudio Grafulla
Washington Grays (1861)
Percy Grainger
Irish Tune from County Derry (1918)
Lincolnshire Posy (1937)
Country Gardens (1928)
Howard Hanson
Chorale and Alleluia (1954)
Paul Hindemith
Symphony in B-flat (1951)
Gustav Holst
Hammersmith: Prelude and Scherzo, Op. 52 (1930)
First Suite in E-flat Major, Op. 28/1 (1909)
Second Suite in F Major, Op. 28/2 (1911)
Karel Husa
Music for Prague (1968)
Apotheosis of This Earth (1971)
Gordon Jacob
An Original Suite (1928)
William Byrd Suite (1923)
Joseph Willcox Jenkins
American Overture for Band, Op. 13 (1956)
David Maslanka
A Child's Garden of Dreams (1981)
Peter Mennin
Canzona (1951)

Darius Milhaud
Suite Française (1944)
Camillo de Nardis
The Universal Judgment (1878)
Ron Nelson
Rocky Point Holiday (1966)
W. Francis McBeth
Masque (1968)
Felix Mendelssohn
Overture in C Major for Wind Band (Ouvertüre für Harmoniemusik) Op. 24 (1824)
Vincent Persichetti
Divertimento, Op. 42 (1950)
Psalm for Band, Op. 53 (1953)
Symphony No. 6, Op. 69 (1956)
Walter Piston
Tunbridge Fair (1950)
Sergei Prokofiev
March in B-flat Major, Op. 99 (1944)
Alfred Reed
Armenian Dances (Part I) (1972)
Armenian Dances (Part II) (1976)
Russian Christmas Music (1968)
H. Owen Reed
La Fiesta Mexicana (1949)
Gioachino Rossini
Scherzo (1863)
Camille Saint-Saëns
Orient et Occident, Op. 25 (1869)
Arnold Schoenberg
Theme and Variations, Op. 43a (1943)
William Schuman
George Washington Bridge (1950)
Joseph Schwantner
...and the mountains rising nowhere (1977)
John P. Sousa
Semper Fidelis (1888)
Stars and Stripes Forever (1896)
The Washington Post (1889)
Richard Strauss
Sonatina No 1 in F major (Aus der Werkstatt eines Invaliden) (1943)
Igor Stravinsky
Concerto for Piano and Wind Instruments (1924)
Symphonies of Wind Instruments (1920/rev. 1947)
Carl Teike
Old Comrades (Alte Kameraden) (1889)
Jaime Texidor
Amparito Roca (1925)
Clifton Williams
Symphonic Suite (1957)
Fanfare and Allegro (1956)
Symphonic Dance No. 3: Fiesta (1967)
Ralph Vaughan Williams
English Folk Song Suite (1923)
Flourish for Wind Band (1939)
Toccata Marziale (1924)

Respected works
These pieces may not necessarily be quite as universally acknowledged as the above list, but occupy an extremely important place in the repertoire nonetheless. Like the previous works, they have proven themselves through many performances, most over a span of decades.

David Amram
King Lear Variations (1966)
James Barnes
Symphonic Overture (1991)
Symphony No. 2
Third Symphony "The Tragic"  (1994)
Fantasy Variations on a Theme by Nicolo Paganini
Alvamar Overture (1981)
C.L. Barnhouse
The Battle of Shiloh (1888)
Leslie Bassett
Concerto Grosso (1982)
Designs, Images and Textures (1965)
Lullaby for Kirsten (1985)
Sounds, Shapes and Symbols (1977)
David Bedford
Sun Paints Rainbows over the Vast Waves (1982)
Frank Bencriscutto
Latina (1964)
Let the Light Shine (1978)
Richard Rodney Bennett
Morning Music (1986)
Warren Benson
Concertino for Alto Saxophone and Band (1954)
The Leaves Are Falling (1963)
The Passing Bell (1974)
Recuerdo (1966)
The Solitary Dancer (1966)
Symphony for Drums and Wind Orchestra (1963)
Symphony No. 2, "Lost Songs" (1983)
Wings (1984)
Jerry Bilik
Block M (1955)
Giouse Bonelli
Symphonic Concert March (1968)   
Eugene Bozza
Children's Overture (1964)
Houston Bright
Prelude and Fugue in F minor (1960)
Howard Cable
Newfoundland Rhapsody (1956)
Quebec Folk Fantasy (1953)
Snake Fence Country (1954)
Alfredo Casella
Introduzione, Corale e Marcia, Op. 57 (1935)
Michael Colgrass
Winds of Nagual (1985)
John Corigliano
Gazebo Dances (1973)
Symphony No. 3 Circus Maximus (2004)
Paul Creston
Celebration Overture (1955)
James Curnow
Where Never Lark Or Eagle Flew (1993)
Elliot Del Borgo
Do Not Go Gentle into that Good Night (1978)
Norman Dello Joio
Fantasies on a Theme by Haydn (1968)
Satiric Dances: For a Comedy by Aristrophanes (1975)
Scenes from the Louvre (1966)
Variants on a Mediaeval Tune (1963)
Thomas C. Duffy
Crystals (1985)
Frank Erickson
Air for Band (1956)
Toccata for Band (1957)
Paul Fauchet
Symphony in B−flat (Symphonie pour musique d′harmonie) (1926)
Henry Fillmore
The Klaxon (1929)
Military Escort (1928)
Rolling Thunder (1916)
Luboš Fišer
Report (1971)
Julius Fučík
The Florentiner March (1907)
Vittorio Giannini
Symphony No. 3 (1959)
David Gillingham
Heroes Lost and Fallen (1990)
Edwin Franko Goldman
On the Mall (1924)
Morton Gould
 
Derivations (1956)
Jericho (1939)
Percy Grainger
"Children's March: Over the Hills and Far Away" (1918)
Colonial Song (1928)
The "Gumsuckers" March (1928)
Handel in the Strand (1911)
Molly on the Shore (1921)
Shepherd's Hey (1918)
Samuel Hazo
Arabesque (2008)
Clare Grundman
Kentucky 1800 (1954)
Kenneth Hesketh
Masque (1987)
Frigyes Hidas
Merry Music (1983)
David Holsinger
In the Spring, at the Time When Kings Go Off to War (1986)
Liturgical Dances (1981)
To Tame the Perilous Skies (1992)
On a Hymnsong of Philip Bliss (1988)
Alan Hovhaness
Symphony No. 4 (1959)

Karel Husa
Concerto for Wind Ensemble (1982)
Gordon Jacob
Music for a Festival (1951)
Robert Jager
Diamond Variations (1967)
Esprit De Corps (1984)
Third Suite (1966)
Tristan Keuris
Catena (1988)
Karl King
Barnum and Bailey′s Favorite (1913)
Broadway One−step, or Two−step (1919)
Boris Kozhevnikov
Symphony No. 3: Slavyanskaya (1950/rev. 1958)
Robert Kurka
"The Good Soldier Schweik" Suite (1956)
Elizabeth Maconchy
Music for Woodwind and Brass (1965)
Martin Mailman
For precious friends hid in death's dateless night (1988)
Liturgical Music (1963)
Pascual Marquina
España Cañi (1921)
W. Francis McBeth
Of Sailors and Whales (1990)
Johan de Meij
Symphony No. 1 The Lord of the Rings (1984–88)
Symphony No. 2 "The Big Apple" (1993)
T-Bone Concerto (1996)
Olivier Messiaen
Et exspecto resurrectionem mortuorum (1964)
Oiseaux exotiques (1956)
Vaclav Nelhybel
Antiphonale (1972)
Festivo (1968)
Trittico (1965)
Ron Nelson
Medieval Suite (1983)
Passacaglia (Homage on B-A-C-H) (1992)
Roger Nixon
Festival Fanfare March (1971)
Fiesta del Pacifico (1966)
Music of Appreciation (1944)
Vincent Persichetti
Masquerade, Op. 102 (1965)
Pageant, Op. 59 (1954)
Parable IX, Op. 121 (1972)
Alfred Reed
A Festival Prelude (1962)
First Suite for Band (1976)
The Hounds of Spring (1980)
Anton Reicha
Commemoration Symphony (1815)
Ottorino Respighi
Huntingtower, P. 173 (1932)
Vincent Frank Safranek
Atlantis (The Lost Continent) Suite in Four Parts (1913) 
Florent Schmitt
Dionysiaques (1913)
Gunther Schuller
Diptych for Brass Quintet and Concert Band (1964)
Meditation (1963)
On Winged Flight (1989)
Symphony for Brass and Percussion, Op. 16 (1950)
Symphony No. 3 In Praise of Winds (1981)
Joseph Schwantner
From a Dark Millennium (1981)
John P. Sousa
The Thunderer (1889)
High School Cadets (1890)
The Fairest of the Fair (1908)
The Pathfinder of Panama (1915)
Sabre and Spurs (1918)
Claude T. Smith
Emperata Overture (1964)
Festival Variations (1982)
Flight (1984)
Incidental Suite (1966)
Philip Sparke
Jubilee Overture (1983)
Eric Stokes
The Continental Harp and Band Report (1975)
Richard Strauss
Festmusik der Stadt Wien (1943)
James Swearingen
Novena (1980)
Frank Ticheli
Blue Shades (1996)
Vesuvius (1997)
Virgil Thomson
A Solemn Music (1949)
Fisher Tull
Sketches on a Tudor Psalm (1971)
Clifton Williams
Caccia and Chorale (1973)
Dedicatory Overture (1964)
Symphonic Dance No. 3 Fiesta
Festival (1962) 
Sinfonians (1960)
Kurt Weill
Kleine Dreigroschenmusik (1929)
Dana Wilson
Piece of Mind (1987)
Haydn Wood
Mannin Veen (1938)
Guy Woolfenden
Gallimaufry (1983)
Illyrian Dances (1986)
Ralph Vaughan Williams
Sea Songs (1923)
John Zdechlik
Chorale and Shaker Dance (1971)

Recent works
The following works are rapidly gaining acceptance as standard repertoire. Most have been composed within the last 30 years.

Richard Rodney Bennett
Concerto for Trumpet and Wind Orchestra (1993)
The Four Seasons (1991)
Steven Bryant
Concerto for Wind Ensemble (2007)
Dusk (2004)
Ecstatic Waters (2008)
Mark Camphouse
A Movement for Rosa (1992)

Asgard, 1st. symphony (2003)
States of mind, 2nd. symphony (2008)
Cue Sheets (2008)
Portraits of Spain (2004)
Hyphotesis for parallel souls (for marimba, flute and wind band)
The rise of the phoenix (2009)
El atardecer de los inocentes (2007)
Wink at you (2011)

Poema Alpestre (1999)
Symphony No. 1, "The Archangels" (2015)
Symphony No. 2, "Views of Edo" (2018)
Óscar Navarro
El Arca de Noe (2005)
Las Siete Trompetas del Apocalipsis (2011)
II Concierto para clarinete y banda (2013)
El Olimpo de los Dioses
Expedition
El ilustre marino
Hispania
Legacy. Concierto para oboe y banda sinfónica
Libertadores
Hell and Heaven. Symphony n.1 for wind band (2019)
Michael Colgrass
Urban Requiem (1996)
Greg Danner
Walls of Zion (1999)
Critical Speed (2001)
The Greatest Generation (2009)
Michael Daugherty
Bells for Stokowski (2001)
Niagara Falls (1997)
Eric Ewazen
A Hymn for the Lost and the Living (2001)
Aldo Rafael Forte
Synergy! (1997)
Rossano Galante
Transcendant Journey (2005)
Afterlife (2015)
Cry Of The Last Unicorn (2011)
Michael Gandolfi
Vientos y Tangos (2003)
David Gillingham
Apocalyptic Dreams (1997)
Galactic Empires (1998)
With Heart and Voice (2000)
Julie Giroux
Culloden (2000)
No Finer Calling (2007)
Khan (2008)
Peter Graham
Harrison's Dream (2001)
Ferrer Ferran
Comic Overture (2012)
En un lugar de La Mancha (2003)
El Misteri del foc (2007)
Dragut El Pirata (2018)
La Passió de Crist. Sinfonia n.2 (2001)
Desert Storm. Symphony n.1 (2000)
The Colossus. Symphony n.4 (2011)
The Great Spirity. Symphony n.3 (2005)
Donald Grantham
Fantasy Variations (1997)
J'ai été au bal (1995)
Southern Harmony (1998)
Baron Cimetière's Mambo (2004)
Edward Gregson
Celebration (1991)
Samuel Hazo
Ride (2003)
Perthshire Majesty (2003)
Fantasy On A Japanese Folk Song (2008)
John Harbison
Three City Blocks (1991)
Evan Hause
Tango Variations (2009)
Kenneth Hesketh
Diaghilev Dances (2002)
Yasuhide Ito
Gloriosa (1990)
Brant Karrick
Bayou Breakdown (2003)
They Shall Run And Be Free (2007)
Scott Lindroth
Spin Cycle (2001)
James MacMillan
Sowetan Spring (1990)
David Maslanka
Give Us This Day: Short Symphony for Wind Ensemble (2006)
Hymn for World Peace (2014)
Symphony No. 4 (1993)
Traveler (2003)
Nicholas Maw
American Games (1991)
John Mackey
The Frozen Cathedral (2013)
Kingfishers Catch Fire (2006)
Redline Tango (2004)
Aurora Awakes (2009)
Asphalt Cocktail (2009)
Hymn to a Blue Hour (2010)
Wine-Dark Sea (2014)

Scott McAllister
Black Dog (for Clarinet & Band, 2003)
Cindy McTee
Circuits (1990)
Andres Valero
Dredred (1999)
Polifemo (2000)
La Vall de la Murta. Sinfonía n.1 (2002)
Teogónica. Sinfonía n.2 (2003)
Lior Navok
Gleams from the Bosom of Darkness (2002)
Tetris (2009)
Ron Nelson
Courtly Airs and Dances (1996)
Epiphanies (Fanfares and Chorales) (1994)
Lauds (1991)
Sonoran Desert Holiday (1994)
Carter Pann
Slalom (2003)
Marco Pütz
Derivations (2003)
Four Sketches (2007)
Steven Reineke
Symphony No.1, New Day Rising (2007)
Jan Van der Roost
Suite Provençale (1992)
Rolf Rudin
The Dream of Oenghus, Op. 37 (1996)
Joseph Schwantner
In Evening's Stillness (1996)
Recoil (2004)
Robert Sheldon
Metroplex (2006)
Chanteys (2000)
As A Wind From The North (2006)
Robert W. Smith
The Divine Comedy (1995)
The Odyssey
Twelve Seconds to the Moon (1996)
Inchon (2001)
Philip Sparke
Dance Movements (1997)
Sunrise at Angel's Gate (2001)
Pittsburgh Overture
Jack Stamp
Cloudsplitter Fanfare (1999)
Escapade (2002)
Gavorkna Fanfare (1990/1)
Steven Stucky
Funeral Music for Queen Mary (1992)
Omar Thomas
Come Sunday (2018)
Frank Ticheli
Amazing Grace (1994)
An American Elegy (2000)
Angels in The Architecture (2009)
Nitro (2006)
Postcard (1991)
Symphony No. 2 (2004)
Michael Tippett
Triumph (1992)
Jess Langston Turner
Rumpelstilzchen (2009)
Through the Looking Glass (2008)
Black Bolt! (2012)
Concertino Caboclo (2012)
Bock Fanfares (2013)
Reanimations (2014)

Arrullo, Suite No. 1 for Band (2004)
Suite No. 2 for Band (2007)
200, Suite No. 3 for Band (2010)
Sinú, Suite No. 4 for Band (2013)
Dan Welcher
Zion (1996)
Circular Marches (1997)
Eric Whitacre
Cloudburst (2002)
Equus (2000)
Ghost Train Triptych (1994)
Godzilla Eats Las Vegas! (1996)
October (2000)
Dana Wilson
Shortcut Home (1998)
Charles Rochester Young
Tempered Steel (1997)

Transcriptions
There are thousands of transcriptions of pieces from other media (mostly orchestra) available for the concert band; however, some transcriptions are performed so often that they can be said to have achieved a place of their own in the concert band repertoire.

John Adams
Short Ride in a Fast Machine (trans. Lawrence Odom)
Isaac Albéniz
Iberia, Book 1: III. Fête-dieu à Seville (trans. Lucien Cailliet)
Malcolm Arnold
Four Scottish Dances (trans. John Paynter)
Prelude, Siciliano, and Rondo (trans. John Paynter)
Tam o' Shanter Overture (trans. John Paynter)
Johann Sebastian Bach 
The Art of Fugue (trans. Kenneth Amis)
Come, Sweet Death (trans. Alfred Reed)
Fantasia in G Major (trans. Goldman / Leist)
Fugue a la Gigue (trans. Gustav Holst)
Jesu, Joy of Man's Desiring (trans. Alfred Reed)
Passacaglia and Fugue in C Minor (trans. Nicholas Falcone or Donald Hunsberger)
Toccata, Adagio, and Fugue in C Major (trans. John Paynter)
Toccata and Fugue in D Minor (trans. Erik W. G. Leidzén or Donald Hunsberger)
Samuel Barber
First Symphony (trans. Guy Duker)
Hector Berlioz
Le corsaire, Op. 21: Overture (trans. Gunther Schuller)
Leonard Bernstein
Overture to "Candide" (trans. Walter Beeler or Clare Grundman)
Slava! A Political Overture (trans. Clare Grundman)
Symphonic Dances from "West Side Story" (trans. Paul Lavender)
Johannes Brahms
Academic Festival Overture (trans. Mark Hindsley)
Haydn Variations (trans. Mark Hindsley)
Eric Coates
The Dam Busters March (trans. William J. Duthoit)
Aaron Copland
Down a Country Lane (trans. Merlin Patterson)
El Salón México (trans. Mark Hindsley)
Lincoln Portrait (trans. Walter Beeler)
An Outdoor Overture (trans. Aaron Copland)
Preamble for a Solemn Occasion (trans. Aaron Copland)
Claude Debussy
Préludes, Book 1: X. La cathédrale engloutie (trans. Merlin Patterson)
Antonín Dvořák
Carnival Overture, Op. 92 (trans. Leigh Steiger)
Symphony No. 9 in E Minor, Op. 95, "From the New World": IV. Finale (trans. Mark Hindsley, Erik W. G. Leidzén or Weston Nicholi)
Edward Elgar
Enigma Variations, Op. 36 (trans. Earl Slocum, John Morrison, or Douglas McLain)
George Gershwin
Cuban Overture (trans. Dwayne S. Milburn)
Prelude No. 2 in C Sharp Minor (trans. John Krance)
Rhapsody in Blue (trans. Ferde Grofé, Donald Hunsberger or Tohru Takahashi)
Alberto Ginastera
Estancia Suite, Op. 8a (trans. Donald Patterson)
Percy Grainger
The Warriors (trans. Frank Pappajohn)
Ferde Grofé
Mississippi Suite, "A Journey in Tones" (trans. Don Chown)
W. C. Handy
Saint Louis Blues March (trans. Jerry Gray and Perry Burgett)
Paul Hindemith
Symphonic Metamorphoses on Themes by Carl Maria von Weber (trans. Keith Wilson)

Gustav Holst 
Capriccio (trans. John Boyd)
A Moorside Suite (trans. Gordon Jacob or Denis Wright)
The Planets (trans. George Smith probably with the collaboration of the composer, Merlin Patterson)

Charles Ives
Country Band March (trans. James Sinclair)
Fugue in C Minor, from String Quartet No. 1, "From the Salvation Army": I: Chorale (trans. James Sinclair)
Old Home Days (trans. Jonathan Elkus)
Variations on "America" (trans. William Schuman / William Rhoads)
Edward MacDowell
Woodland Sketches, Op. 51 (trans. Frank Winterbottom)
Felix Mendelssohn
Fingal's Cave Overture (trans. Julius Seredy or Frank Winterbottom)
Modest Mussorgsky
Night on Bald Mountain (trans. William Schaefer or Mark Hindsley)
Pictures at an Exhibition (trans. Paul Lavender, Mark Hindsley, Erik W. G. Leidzén or Tohru Takahashi)
Alfred Newman
20th Century Fox Fanfare (1933)
Nikolai Rimsky-Korsakov
Procession of the Nobles from "Mlada" (trans. Erik W. G. Leidzén)
Scheherazade (trans. Mark Hindsley)
Ottorino Respighi
The Pines of Rome (trans. Guy Duker or Yoshihiro Kimura)
Richard Rodgers
Victory at Sea Symphonic Scenario (trans. Robert Russell Bennett)
Gioacchino Rossini
Italian in Algiers Overture (trans. Lucien Cailliet)
Tancredi Overture (trans. Leonard Falcone)
William Tell Overture (trans. Erik W. G. Leidzén)
Camille Saint-Saëns
Marche Militaire Française from "Suite Algérienne" (trans. Mayhew Lake or Mark Hindsley)
William Schuman
New England Triptych (1956)
Dmitri Shostakovich
Festive Overture (trans. Donald Hunsberger)
Folk Dances (trans. H. Robert Reynolds)
Galop from "Moscow, Cheryomushki" (trans. Donald Hunsberger)
October (trans. Preston Mitchell)
Jean Sibelius
Finlandia (trans. Lucien Cailliet)
Richard Strauss
Allerseelen, Op. 10, nr. 8 (trans. Albert O. Davis)
Igor Stravinsky
The Firebird Suite (trans. Guy Duker, Thomas Knox, or Lawrence Odom)
Fireworks (trans. Mark Rogers)
Arthur Sullivan/Charles Mackerras
Pineapple Poll (trans. William J. Duthoit)
Franz von Suppé
Light Cavalry Overture (trans. Henry Fillmore)
Pyotr Ilyich Tchaikovsky
1812 Overture (trans. Conway Brown, Yoshihiro Kimura, Mayhew Lake or Mark Williams)
Suite No. 3 in G Major (trans. Frank Winterbottom)
Dance of the Jesters from "The Snow Maiden" (trans. Ray Cramer)
Marche Slave, Op. 31 (trans. L.P. Laurendeau) 
Richard Wagner
Elsa's Procession to the Cathedral from "Lohengrin" (trans. Lucien Cailliet)
Prelude to Act III of "Lohengrin" (trans. Mark Hindsley)
"Tannhauser" Overture (trans. Vincent Frank Safranek or John Philip Sousa)
William Walton
Crown Imperial (trans. William J. Duthoit)
Carl Maria von Weber
Invitation to the Dance 
Oberon Overture (trans. Mark Hindsley)
John Williams
Hymn to the Fallen (trans. Paul Lavender)
Olympic Fanfare and Theme (trans. James Curnow)
Giuseppe Verdi
Prelude to Act 1, La Traviata (trans. Leonard Falcone)
Ralph Vaughan Williams
Fantasia on ″Greensleeves″ (trans. Douglas Wagner)

Recordings of concert band literature

The Klavier Wind Recording Project was started in 1989 by Eugene Corporon while he was director of bands at the University of Cincinnati – College-Conservatory of Music. It has helped provide recordings of many of the most important and more recent pieces in the wind band literature. The recording project continues today, having followed Corporon to the University of North Texas. The project continues to this day under the label GIA Publications. Corporon's recordings exist in the form of the Teaching Music Through Performance In Band Series, Windworks Series and Composer's Collections. Still more recordings have been released by The Keystone Winds, conducted by Jack Stamp. The Keystone Winds consists of faculty, alumni and students from Indiana University of Pennsylvania. 

Two of the most prominent professional bands are the Dallas Winds, conducted by Jerry Junkin, and the Tokyo Kosei Wind Orchestra, conducted by Takeshi Ooi. Both bands were at one point led by Frederick Fennell who recorded several albums of concert band literature with them.

See also 
 List of works commissioned by Kappa Kappa Psi or Tau Beta Sigma – a list of all concert band works commissioned by Kappa Kappa Psi, Tau Beta Sigma, National Honorary Band Fraternity and Sorority, or chapters of either organization.
 Symphonies for concert band
 Heritage of the March recording series

References

External resources
BandMusicPDF
The Wind Repertory Project

Concert band